Phatanka (Aymara for stomach, belly (of animals), hispanicized spellings Patanca, Patanga) is a mountain in the Cusco Region in the Andes of Peru, about  high. It is situated in the Canchis Province, Checacupe District.

References

Mountains of Peru
Mountains of Cusco Region